Da, smert (translated as Yes, death or Viva la Muerte) is a 2004 documentary film by Russian filmmaker Alyona Polunina.

Content
The film shows national-bolsheviks who lived in squatted headquarter of NBP in Moscow.

Cast
 Vladimir Linderman
 Eduard Limonov

References

External links
 Da, smert on YouTube

 Interview about the film with Alyona Polunina in Rossiyskaya Gazeta
 Opinions about the film on Radio Svoboda

2004 films
Films directed by Alyona Polunina
2004 short documentary films
Russian short documentary films
2000s Russian-language films
National Bolshevism
Eduard Limonov